Estadio Metropolitano de Techo is a multi-use stadium in Bogotá, Colombia. It is currently used mostly for football matches and is the home stadium of La Equidad, Tigres F.C., and Bogotá F.C. The stadium holds 8,000 people.

References

Techo
1959 establishments in Colombia
Sports venues in Bogotá